Santanoni is also the name of the Santanoni Preserve, the  once-private preserve that contained Santanoni Peak.

Santanoni Peak is a mountain located in Essex County, New York. 
The mountain is part of the Santanoni Mountains of the Adirondacks.
The mountain's name is believed to be an Abenaki derivative of "Saint Anthony"; the first French fur traders and missionaries having named the area for Saint Anthony of Padua.
Santanoni Peak is flanked to the north by Panther Peak, and to the southwest by Little Santanoni Mountain.

The east slopes of Santanoni Peak drain into the eastern Santanoni Brook, thence into Henderson Lake, the source of the Hudson River, and into New York Bay.
The south end of Santanoni Peak drains into the southern Santanoni Brook, thence into Newcomb Lake, the Newcomb River, and the Hudson River.
The southwest side of Santanoni drains into Ermine Brook, thence into Moose Creek, the Cold River, the Raquette River, the Saint Lawrence River in Canada, and into the Gulf of Saint Lawrence.
The west slopes of Santanoni drain into Calahan Brook, thence into Moose Creek.

Santanoni Peak is within the High Peaks Wilderness Area of New York's Adirondack Park.

See also 
 List of mountains in New York
 Northeast 111 4,000-footers
 Adirondack High Peaks
 Adirondack Forty-Sixers

Gallery

External links 
  Peakbagger.com: Santanoni Peak
  Summitpost.org: Santanoni Peak

References

Mountains of Essex County, New York
Adirondack High Peaks
Mountains of New York (state)